Allison Independent School District was a school district headquartered in Allison, Texas.

On July 1, 2003 it merged into the Fort Elliott Consolidated Independent School District.

References

External links

 Profile of the Allison School District - Texas Education Agency (TEA)
 TEA maps:
 PDF: Parts in Wheeler and Hemphill counties
 Web: Parts in Wheeler and Hemphill counties

Former school districts in Texas
School districts in Hemphill County, Texas
School districts in Wheeler County, Texas
School districts disestablished in 2003
2003 disestablishments in Texas